The Estreichers were a family of notable humanists and scientists from Kraków, Poland, which included:

 Dominik Oesterreicher (1750–1809), painter and scholar of fine arts
 Alojzy Estreicher (1786–1852), botanist and entomologist, Dominik's son
 Karol Estreicher (senior) (1827–1908), historian of art and theater, literary critic and bibliographer, Alojzy's son
 Stanisław Estreicher (1869–1939),  historian of law and bibliographer, Karol Senior's son
 Tadeusz Estreicher (1871–1952), chemist and historian, Karol Senior's son
 Karol Estreicher (junior) (1906–1984), historian of law, writer and bibliographer, Stanisław's son
 Stefan Estreicher (1952–), theoretical physicist

Other people with the same surname include:

 Samuel Estreicher (b. 1948), American jurist

See also
Österreicher (surname)